Microdecemplex rolfei is the only known species of the extinct, small-bodied millipede order Microdecemplicida, a member of the extinct subclass Arthropleuridea. Fossils, measuring less than 10 mm in length, are known from the Panther Mountain Formation of New York State, dating to the Middle Devonian. This species apparently lacks antennae and shows sexual dimorphism in its hind legs, which may be similar in function to the telopods of male living pill-millipedes that are used to grasp females during mating.

References

Devonian myriapods
Prehistoric myriapod genera
Millipede genera
Devonian arthropods of North America
Fossil taxa described in 2000